Dictyotrypeta is a genus of the family Tephritidae, better known as fruit flies.

Species
Dictyotrypeta atacta (Hendel, 1914)
Dictyotrypeta cometa (Malloch, 1933)
Dictyotrypeta crenulata (Wulp, 1900)
Dictyotrypeta incisum (Wulp, 1899)
Dictyotrypeta strobelioides (Hendel, 1914)
Dictyotrypeta syssema Hendel, 1914

References

Tephritinae
Tephritidae genera
Diptera of North America
Diptera of South America